Tista Bagchi (born ), Professor of Linguistics in the University of Delhi, is a distinguished Indian linguist and ethicist. Bagchi trained in Sanskrit College, Kolkata, the University of Delhi, and the University of Chicago, from where she obtained her PhD in Linguistics, her work spans issues of semantics and syntax in languages in general and South Asian languages in particular, questions of ethics in the application of medical technology and social interaction, and translations of iconic texts in Bangla literature and comparative philology. Bagchi has also been active in the area of cognitive sciences with special interests in the relationships amongst sentence structure, computation, linguistic meaning, and human cognition. Bagchi was the Robert F. & Margaret S. Goheen Fellow for the academic year 2001–2002 at the National Humanities Center, Research Triangle Park, North Carolina, and a scientist under the CSIR Mobility Scheme at the National Institute of Science, Technology, and Development Studies, New Delhi, for two years during 2010–2012.

Bagchi is the eldest daughter of economist Amiya Kumar Bagchi and feminist critic and activist Jasodhara Bagchi.

Books
Languages of India:  Annotated translation of Gopal Haldar, Bharater Bhasha [in Bengali]. New Delhi:  National Book Trust.  (2000)
English Syntax:  Introductory textbook-cum-manual for the M. A. English course (Language Stream) of the Indira Gandhi National Open University. New Delhi:  School of Humanities, IGNOU.  (2000)
Proceedings of the International Seminar on Construction of Knowledge held at Vidya Bhawan Society, Udaipur, 16–18 April 2004, jointly edited with R. K. Agnihotri, Vidya Bhavan Society, Udaipur (2005)
Jnaan ka Nirmaan (in Hindi:  Construction of Knowledge: translation of co-edited 2005 volume with R. K. Agnihotri, tr. Sushila Joshi), Vidya Bhavan Society, Udaipur. (2007)
The Sentence in Language and Cognition, Lanham, MD:  Lexington Books, Rowman & Littlefield Publishing Group.  (2007)
Pragmatics and Autolexical Grammar:  In Honor of Jerry Sadock, jointly edited with Etsuyo Yuasa, and Katharine P. Beals. Amsterdam and Philadelphia:  John Benjamins.  (2011)

Journal articles and articles published in edited volumes
Control, reflexives, and automodularity in Bangla imperfective participial complements. In Katharine P. Beals et al., eds. (1993) CLS 29, vol. 1:  The Main Session, 17–32. Chicago:  Chicago Linguistic Society.
Bangla correlative pronouns, relative clause order, and D-linking. In Miriam Butt, Tracy Holloway King, and Gillian Ramchand, eds. (1994) Theoretical Perspectives on Word Order in South Asian Languages, 1329 Stanford: Center for the Study of Language and Information (CSLI).
Bengali writing. In Peter T. Daniels and William Bright, eds. (1996) The World's Writing Systems, pp. 399–403. New York:  Oxford University Press.
Generic sentences, social kinds, and stereotypes. In Rajeev Bhargava et al., eds. (1999) Multiculturalism, Liberalism, and Democracy, pp. 308–322. New Delhi:  Oxford University Press.
Romany language. In The Students’ Britannica-India (2000), vol. iv, pp. 307–308. New Delhi:  Encyclopædia Britannica Inc.
Turing's 'Computing Machinery and Intelligence' revisited: cognition from a linguistic perspective. In J. R. Isaac and Karuna Batra, eds. (2000) Cognitive Systems:  Reviews and Previews, pp. 728–733. New Delhi:  NIIT-Phoenix.
Linguistic methods and minority languages in India. In Sujata Patel et al., eds. (2002) Thinking Social Science in India:  Essays in Honour of Alice Thorner. New Delhi:  Sage.
Causation and tense in subordinate clauses:  conjunctive participles and conditionals in Bangla and Hindi. In Salikoko S. Mufwene, Elaine J. Francis, and Rebecca S. Wheeler, eds. (2005) Polymorphous Linguistics:  Jim McCawley’s Legacy, pp. 109–134. Cambridge, Mass.:  MIT Press.
Morally right action under silence and disempowerment. In XXIst World Philosophy Conference Proceedings, vol. 9: Philosophical Anthropology, ed. (2006) Stephen Voss, pp. 161 –166. Istanbul:  International Federation of Philosophical Societies (FISP) and Turkish Philosophical Society.
On theta role assignment by feature checking. In Linguistik Aktuell 108: Argument Structure, eds. (2007) Eric Reuland, Tanmoy Bhattacharya, and Giorgos Spathas, pp. 159–173. Amsterdam/Philadelphia: John Benjamins.
“Biological”. Translation of Narendranath Mitra, “jaiba”, in Jasodhara Bagchi, Subhoranjan Dasgupta, and Subhasree Ganguly, eds. (2009) The Trauma and the Triumph:  Gender and Partition in Eastern India, vol. II. Kolkata:  Stree Publications.
The signing system of Mudra in traditional Indian dance. Paragrana: Internationale Zeitschrift für Historische Anthropologie,(2010) Band 19.1: pp. 259–266.
Review of John Peterson (2011) A Grammar of Kharia (Leiden:Brill). Himalayan Linguistics 11.1 (online), https://web.archive.org/web/20140512220431/http://www.linguistics.ucsb.edu/HimalayanLinguistics/reviews/2012/HL1101_RA.pdf
Regulation of human reproduction-related technologies in India. In India Science and Technology, vol. 2, eds. (2013) NISTADS Editorial Team, pp. 243–245. New Delhi:  Foundation Books (Cambridge University Press, India) and CSIR-NISTADS.
Sign language and signing in the traditions of performance in India. Forthcoming in People’s Linguistic Survey of India (Chief Editor: Ganesh N. Devy): Indian Sign Language(s), eds. (2014) Tanmoy Bhattacharya, Nisha Grover, and Surinder P. K. Randhawa, 118–127. New Delhi: Orient Blackswan.

Membership in learned bodies and committees
 Member, Chicago Linguistic Society, 1988–1993.
 Member, Student-Faculty Liaison Committee, Department of Linguistics, University of Chicago, 1992–1993.
 Member, Faculty of Arts, University of Delhi, 1994–1997 and 2000–2001.
 Member, Linguistic Society of America, since 2000.
 International Associate Member, American Philosophical Association, since 2002.
 Overseas Associate Member, Forum for European Philosophy, 2002–2006.
 Member, Society for Applied Philosophy, United Kingdom, 2005–2007.
 Nominated Member, Indian Council for Social Science Research, 2005–2008.
 Member-Representative for the ICSSR, Indian Council for Philosophical Research, 2006–2008.
 Member, Academic Council, The English & Foreign Languages University, 2008–2009.
 Member, Academic Council, Central Sikkim University, 2008–2011.
 Member, Technical Advisory Committee of the Social Sciences Division, Indian Statistical Institute, 2012–2014.
 Member, Advisory Committee, Centre for Neural and Cognitive Sciences, University of Hyderabad, 2013–2014.

References

External links
Sikkimuniversity.ac.in
Linguistlist.org

Living people
1964 births
20th-century Indian linguists
Academic staff of Delhi University
Indian women linguists
Bengali scientists
Indian women science writers
Indian social sciences writers
English-language writers from India
Women writers from Delhi
21st-century Indian linguists
20th-century Indian women writers
20th-century Indian writers
21st-century Indian women writers
21st-century Indian writers
Women educators from Delhi